Dickson Concepts (International) Ltd. (DCIL) is a Hong Kong based luxury goods company. It has held the distributorship of Ralph Lauren products in Asia for more than 20 years. The company is controlled by its founder and Executive Chairman Dickson Poon.

History 
The company Dickson Concepts was founded by Dickson Poon.

In 1987, ST Dupont was sold to Dickson Concepts.

In 1991, Harvey Nichols was acquired by the company from the Burton Group.

In January 2005, the company announced the acquisition of Bertolucci SA, manufacturer and distributor of luxury Swiss watches.

In mid-February 2009, the company announced the end of its 20-plus year distributorship for Polo Ralph Lauren products in Asia effective 31 December 2009. The license is estimated by analysts to contribute 10 percent of its revenues.

Ownership
As of 30 September 2018, Dickson Poon controls 54.68% of the voting capital of DCIL through two trusts.

References

External links 
Official site
 

Companies listed on the Hong Kong Stock Exchange
Retail companies of Hong Kong
Offshore companies of Bermuda
Companies in the Hang Seng Index
Conglomerate companies of Hong Kong